Willy Harlander (1931–2000) was a German film and television actor. A regular on West German television, he also appeared in several Bavarian sex comedies during the 1970s.

Filmography

References

Bibliography 
 Joachim Hess. Tatort A-Z: 40 Jahre Tatort - Referenzbuch mit Glossar 1970 - 2012. Epubli, 2012.

External links 
 

1931 births
2000 deaths
German male film actors
German male television actors
People from Regensburg